Robert Spratt Cockrell (January 22, 1866 – June 23, 1957) was a justice of the Florida Supreme Court from December 1, 1902, to January 2, 1917.

Cockrell's appointment was inadvertent. Governor William Sherman Jennings had meant to appoint  Robert's brother Alston Cockrell.

Cockrell served on the court until he was defeated in his third reelection campaign by Jefferson B. Browne in 1916. He allegedly lost the election because an opinion he wrote that alienated railroad interests which then lobbied for Browne. He lectured at the University of Florida College of Law from 1919 until 1940, and his students included Harold Sebring and Richard Ervin.

He was on the losing side of a 3-2 decision on referendums that was passed by both the House and Senate in Florida but not signed.

Cockrell was born in Livingston, Alabama He obtained his bachelor's degree, masters and law degrees from the University of Virginia, then going on to study for a year at Humboldt University in Berlin. He then passed the bar two years later in 1891.

He wife Cortney the daughter of a Florida governor had died before him, they had two daughters and one son.

He died in Miami, Florida at the age of 91. He had been living in Coconut Grove with one of his daughters at this time.

References

External links 
 Robert Spratt Cockrell - Find a Grave

Justices of the Florida Supreme Court
University of Virginia School of Law alumni
University of Virginia alumni
1866 births
1957 deaths